is a Japanese business magnate and former actor known for his role as Mirai Hibino/Ultraman Mebius in the 2006-2007 tokusatsu series Ultraman Mebius  and several spin-offs in the Ultra Series following that. Igarashi was affiliated with the acting unit D-BOYS, produced by Watanabe Entertainment.

Career
Igarashi started his entertainment career auditioning for D-BOYS in the group's first open audition, held on July 27, 2004. Winner of the Grand Prix second place, Igarashi joined the group shortly after, along with first placer Yuichi Nakamura and third placer Katsuki Nakamura.

In early 2006, Igarashi conquered his first lead role as Mirai Hibino/Ultraman Mebius in the tokusatsu series Ultraman Mebius, the 40th anniversary production in the Ultraman series. He was chosen for the role for being able to convey the part of a "rookie" hero well, being at the time a new actor with little experience in demanding lead roles himself. A fan of the Ultraman series, Igarashi has declared that the desire to play the role of Ultraman was one of the reasons he entered the entertainment world, and that being able to work with the same actors who had played his childhood heroes was one of his highest personal accomplishments. Igarashi was so fond of his work in the series that he eventually incorporated the Möbius strip sign "∞" to his autograph.

With the end of Mebius in March 2007, Igarashi turned his focus to television series and invested on broadening his work. The heroic Mirai of Mebius was followed by diverse characters such as the young psychopath Otoya in the adult drama Watashitachi no Kyokasho, the naive otaku Shinji in the teenage comedy Hana-Kimi and the lively street musician Mitsuru in the late night suspense Shigeshoshi, allowing Igarashi to develop his acting through various genres and different character types.

June 2007 marked Igarashi's theatre debut, guest-starring in the musical D-BOYS STAGE Volume 1: Kanbai Onrei, a D-BOYS project featuring all group members, in the same manner of the 2006 drama/documentary series DD-BOYS. In 2008 he will again guest star in D-BOYS STAGE Volume 2: Last Game. In October 2007 came Igarashi's radio debut with D-RADIO BOYS, another D-BOYS project. Igarashi hosts the weekly show with Shigeshoshi co-star Masato Wada, featuring guest D-BOYS members in each show.

He has also been chosen as a member of D-BOYS special unit D*DATE. After the successful release of D*Date's 2013 single "Glory Days", Igarashi Shunji declared his retirement by the end of November 2013 from the Entertainment Industry in one of the D8Date live performances. At the beginning of November prior Igarashi announcing his retirement, this announcement was officially introduced in the D-Boys official page.

On March 4, 2021 Igarashi has expressed in interest in returning to the entertainment industry.

Filmography

Television

Cinema

Other media

Theatre
 Out of Order (2007)
 D-BOYS STAGE Vol.1:  Kanbai Onrei (2007)
 D-BOYS STAGE Vol.2: Last Game (2008, in pre-production)

Radio
 D-RADIO BOYS (2007–present, Bay FM)

Promotional media

Igarashi has been featured in the following promotional releases:

CDs

 Ultraman Mebius/Run through! -CREW GUYS- - Project DMM with Ultra Bouei-tai (Ultraman Mebius)

Photobooks

 D-BOYS: D-BOYS (2005/04)
 D-BOYS: START! (2006/03)
 mirai (2006/09) - solo photobook
 Hanazakari no Kimi Tachi e - Ikemen Paradise Making Book (2007/09)

References

External links
Official Blog
Official Profile at Watanabe Entertainment
Shunji's Official friendster page
D-BOYS official website
Wikipedia Japanese article on 五十嵐 隼士
Wikipedia Japanese article on D-BOYS

1986 births
Japanese male television actors
Living people